Freetrade is a UK-based financial technology company which offers a freemium share dealing service. The company was founded in 2016 and launched an iOS app in October 2018, followed by an Android version in April 2019. In October 2021 the company surpassed one million registered users, with quarterly trading volumes as of March 2021 of over £1 billion. As of November 2021 Freetrade has over £1 billion of assets under administration.

History
Freetrade was founded in September 2015 by Adam Dodds and Davide Fioranelli. In 2019, it brought aboard venture capitalist Molten Ventures to complete a $15M Series A financing. The first CTO was André Mohammed, who in 2019 left to join Revolut. Viktor Nebehaj, an early crowdfunding investor, joined the firm as chief marketing officer. Ian Fuller joined as VP of Engineering from Snapchat in 2018 and left in 2021. 

The company's $69M Series B round was announced in March 2021, led by Left Lane Capital, with participation from L Catterton and Molten Ventures. However, the company struggled to find new backers at a higher valuation in 2022 and had to resort to a convertible loan note supplemented by a further crowdfunded round and a staff reduction of around 15%.

In January 2020, the company was accused of fostering a culture of fear after a City A.M. investigation into staff claims of a toxic workplace. Co-founder Adam Dodds responded, saying it has an honest and candid culture that not everyone is comfortable with.

In January 2022 the UK Financial Conduct Authority (FCA) issued a second supervisory notice ordering the company to remove "all paid for sponsored influencer advertisements and posts" across a variety of social media platforms. This notice noted the adverts were misleading "as there are no guarantees of positive returns on any investment", thus increasing the risk of vulnerable people in debt increasing their debt.

Operations
Freetrade offers a commission-free trading app on the Android and iOS platforms, which is open to users in the United Kingdom. Users may trade equities and ETFs listed in the UK and the US. For US assets, users may hold and trade fractional shares. Portfolios can be held in a tax-free ISA or SIPP (personal pension), in each case for a flat monthly fee. Freetrade launched its premium product, Freetrade Plus, in October 2020, offering an expanded list of tradable securities and order types. The product backend is hosted on Google Cloud Platform and Freetrade operate on a serverless computing model.

In 2020, Freetrade had plans to enter the wider European market, beginning with Sweden, Ireland and the Netherlands.

Reception
Since its launch in October 2018, Freetrade has grown to more than 1 million registered users. The number of active users and average assets per user is a matter of speculation. In an early review of the service, Forbes described it as "a challenger stock trading app built for the Instagram age", and commended it on being the first and only challenger stockbroker in the UK, but criticized the poor financial charting, and its then lack of US securities. In a 2019 review for MoneyWeek, David Stevenson described the available securities, which by then included both UK and US listed stocks and ETFs, as a "decent slug of the large-cap universe". And while it did not offer a full-service platform such as established competitors Hargreaves Lansdown or AJ Bell, "for those simply looking for regular, low-cost savings, I think Freetrade is hard to beat". Stevenson described Freetrade as his favourite fintech. At The Next Web, Matthew Hughes credited Freetrade with "radically [changing] how I manage my money", inciting him to invest more, and increase his knowledge of the markets.

Awards
British Bank Awards 2021 – Best Online Trading Platform
Good Money Guide 2021 – Best Commission-Free Stockbroker
British Bank Awards 2020 – Best Online Trading Platform
British Bank Awards 2019 – Best Share Trading Platform
Good Money Guide 2019 – People's Choice
Consumer Investment Awards 2019 – Best New Investment Service

References

External links
 

British companies established in 2016
Financial services companies established in 2016
Financial services companies of the United Kingdom
Online brokerages
Financial technology companies
2016 establishments in the United Kingdom
Companies based in London